Wesley Britt (born November 21, 1981) is a former American football offensive tackle and the husband of Senator Katie Britt of Alabama. He was drafted by the San Diego Chargers in the fifth round of the 2005 NFL Draft. He played college football at Alabama. He went to Cullman High School.

Early years
Britt was born in Cullman, Alabama, and attended Cullman High School where he graduated in 2000.

College career
Britt accepted a scholarship offer from the University of Alabama in 2000. After redshirting his first year, Britt was a career starter and started in 46 games throughout the 2001, 2002, 2003 and 2004 seasons at Alabama. He did miss the final four games of his junior season after breaking his leg against Tennessee in 2003. He was named First-team All-American by the CFN, third-team by Associated Press, second-team by Rivals.com as a senior in 2004, three time First-team All-Southeastern Conference by the Associated Press and league's coaches in 2002, 2003, 2004, and named to 2004 SEC Good Works Team. Wesley also won the Jacobs Blocking Trophy as the SEC's top offensive lineman in 2004.

Professional career

San Diego Chargers
Britt was drafted in the fifth round (164th overall) by the San Diego Chargers in the 2005 NFL Draft. He was released by the Chargers on September 4, 2005.

New England Patriots
Britt was signed to the practice squad of the New England Patriots on September 5, 2005, where he spent the season. He made the Patriots' 53-man roster in 2006, and made his first career start in Week 4 against the Cincinnati Bengals. He would go on to play in 10 total games in 2006. The next season, Britt was active for four games, starting the season finale against the New York Giants. He did not start any games in 2008 and was active for two total games. Following the season, as a restricted free agent, Britt was not offered a tender by the Patriots, but was re-signed to a separate contract on March 16. He was released by the Patriots during final cuts on September 5, 2009.

Personal life
Wesley Britt is married to Katie Britt, the United States senator from Alabama. They reside in Montgomery, Alabama and have two children. Wesley Britt is an economic development representative with Alabama Power.

Brothers Taylor and Justin also played football for Alabama.

References

External links
 New England Patriots bio
 https://247sports.com/college/alabama/Article/None-Will-Forget-Britt-Inspiration-104719835

1981 births
Alabama Crimson Tide football players
American football offensive tackles
Living people
New England Patriots players
People from Cullman, Alabama
Players of American football from Alabama
San Diego Chargers players
Sportspeople from Montgomery, Alabama